Rhabdodemaniidae is a family of nematodes belonging to the order Enoplida.

Genera:
 Conistomella Stekhoven, 1942
 Rhabdodemania Baylis & Daubney, 1926

References

Nematode families